Alliance School of Law is a private law school situated beside Anekal Main Road, Chandapura in Bengaluru in the Indian state of Karnataka. It offers B.A. LL.B. (Hons.) and Bachelor of Business Administration or B.B.A., LL.B. courses and LL.M. The courses are approved by Bar Council of India (BCI), New Delhi and affiliated to Alliance University. It also offers Ph.D. in Law. Alliance School of Law is one of the best legal institute in India and it was established in 2010.

References

Law schools in Karnataka
Colleges in Bangalore
Educational institutions established in 2010
2010 establishments in Karnataka
Law schools in India